Vedia is a town, created in 1913, in the far northwestern part of Buenos Aires Province, Argentina. It is the administrative centre for Leandro N. Alem Partido.

The town is named after the Argentine military leader Julio de Vedia.

Notes and references

External links

Populated places in Buenos Aires Province
Populated places established in 1885